The Danish Social Liberal Youth (Danish: Radikal Ungdom, literally Radical Youth, abbreviated RU), is a political youth organization in Denmark, built around the ideals of social liberalism. Radical indicates a connection to 19th and 20th century radicalism, a connection shared with the organisation's mother party, the Danish Social Liberal Party.

The current organization was founded on April 30, 1994 under the name Radikal Ungdom of 1994, after the former youth organization Radikal Ungdom was dissolved due to widespread fraud with funding from the Danish Youth Council. The organization bore the name Radikal Ungdom of 1994, until it was changed back to Radikal Ungdom at the organisation's national congress in 2015. The original organisation was founded in Copenhagen in 1904 and merged into a larger national organization founded in 1911.

The Social Liberal Youth of Denmark is a member of three liberal international umbrella organizations: The Nordic Centre Youth (NCF), European Liberal Youth (LYMEC) and the International Federation of Liberal Youth (IFLRY).

At the 2019 party congress, Sigrid Friis Proschowsky stepped down as party president after two years of leadership. She was succeeded by Lukas Lunøe. Caroline Valentiner-Branth and Cornelius Sode were elected as organizational vice-president and political vice-president respectively.

Party presidents after 1994 
 2022–present: Maria Georgi Sloth
 2020–2022: Jacob Robsøe
 2019–2020: Lukas Lunøe
 2017–2019: Sigrid Friis Proschowsky
 2015–2017: Victor Boysen
 2013–2015: Christopher Røhl
 2011–2013: Ditte Søndergaard
 2009–2011: Simon Dyhr
 2008–2009: Emil Dyred
 2006–2008: Andreas Steenberg
 2003–2006: Zenia Stampe
 2000–2003: Simon Emil Ammitzbøll
 1999–2000: Majken Fjeldgaard Arensbach
 1997–1999: Christian Brix Møller
 1996–1997: Anders Thomsen
 1994–1996: Morten Rixen

See also
 Politics of Denmark
 Radicalism

References

External links 
 

Radical parties
Youth wings of political parties in Denmark
Youth wings of liberal parties
1911 establishments in Denmark